Terrence Phelan (born 16 March 1967) is a football coach and former professional footballer. He is the technical director of Indian I-League 2nd Division side South United FC.

Nicknamed "The Scuttler", he played as a left-back from 1984 to 2009. He played in the Premier League for Manchester City, Chelsea and Everton, as well as in the Football League for Leeds United, Swansea City, Wimbledon, Crystal Palace, Fulham, Sheffield United. He finished his career abroad for Charleston Battery and Otago United. He also made 42 appearances for the Irish national team, whom he represented at the 1994 FIFA World Cup.

During 2015, he was the head coach of Kerala Blasters of the Indian Super League, and has remained in Indian football ever since.

Club career
Phelan started his career as part of the Leeds United youth system, and made 19 appearances for Leeds in the 1985–86 season, but was released on a free transfer by Leeds manager Billy Bremner. Phelan then spent a year at Swansea City, earning a move to top division Wimbledon a year later.

In his first season at Wimbledon, Phelan was a member of the team which won the FA Cup with a shock win over Liverpool in the final. He also helped Wimbledon finish seventh in the league on two occasions during his time there.

After five years at Wimbledon in which he made 198 appearances, Phelan was transferred to Manchester City for £2.5 million at the start of the 1992–93 season, equalling the British record transfer fee for a defender as well as equalling the club's record fee. At City, Phelan made 122 appearances over three and a half seasons. Arguably the best goal of Phelan's career came at Maine Road for City in an FA Cup tie against Tottenham Hotspur when the full-back ran the length of the pitch skipping several challenges and keeping his cool to slot home.

Phelan moved to Chelsea in November 1995, where he spent two years on the fringes of the first team (playing just 15 times in the league) before moving to Everton, where he played regularly under Joe Royle, until he suffered an injury from which he took nearly 18 months to recover.

During Phelan's injury, Walter Smith took over as Everton manager (after Howard Kendall's third spell as manager lasted just one season), and Phelan only played twice under Smith at the start of the 1999–2000 season. He was subsequently loaned to Crystal Palace. Phelan moved to Fulham in February 2000, and was part of the Fulham team which won promotion to the Premier League in 2001. However, Phelan was released by Fulham following promotion, having just made two league appearances that campaign. Phelan then had a short spell with Sheffield United before moving to the United States, where he played for Charleston Battery and also coached young players. In October 2005, Phelan was named as player-coach of Otago United in the New Zealand Football Championship. He remained as coach for four seasons up until the end of the 2008–09 season when, owing to poor results, he was replaced by his assistant Malcolm Fleming for the 2009–10 season.

International career
He made 42 appearances for the Irish national team, whom he represented at the 1994 FIFA World Cup.

Coaching career
Phelan is one of the coaches at the new Templegate Training Academy in Ardwick, Manchester.

On 6 April 2015, Phelan was appointed as a Technical Director of Kerala Blasters' grassroots programme. On 1 November 2015, he was made the head coach of the Blasters after Peter Taylor was sacked. He returned to his previous role when Steve Coppell was appointed as head coach. He then went on to become technical director of Bangalore Super Division club South United in August 2019.

Honours
Wimbledon
FA Cup: 1988

Fulham
Football League First Division: 2000–01

Charleston Battery
USL A-League: 2003
Southern Derby: 2003 2005

Awards
Football League Fourth Division PFA Team of the Year: 1986–87
FAI Young International Player of the Year: 1992

See also
 List of Republic of Ireland international footballers born outside the Republic of Ireland

References

External links
 Terry Phelan Interview

1967 births
Living people
Black British sportsmen
English people of Irish descent
English footballers
Republic of Ireland association footballers
Association football defenders
Leeds United F.C. players
Swansea City A.F.C. players
Wimbledon F.C. players
Manchester City F.C. players
Chelsea F.C. players
Everton F.C. players
Crystal Palace F.C. players
Fulham F.C. players
Sheffield United F.C. players
Charleston Battery players
Southern United FC players
English Football League players
Premier League players
Black_Irish_sportspeople
USL First Division players
Republic of Ireland international footballers
Republic of Ireland B international footballers
Republic of Ireland under-21 international footballers
Republic of Ireland under-23 international footballers
1994 FIFA World Cup players
English expatriate footballers
English expatriate sportspeople in the United States
Expatriate soccer players in the United States
English football managers
Kerala Blasters FC non-playing staff
Kerala Blasters FC head coaches
Indian Super League head coaches
English expatriate football managers
English expatriate sportspeople in India
Expatriate football managers in India
FA Cup Final players